Chrysophyllum cainito is a tropical tree of the family Sapotaceae. It is native to the Isthmus of Panama, where it was domesticated. It has spread to the Greater Antilles and the West Indies and is now grown throughout the tropics, including Southeast Asia. It grows rapidly and reaches 20 meters in height.

Name
The fruit has numerous names. It is also called variously tar apple, star apple, purple star apple, golden leaf tree, abiaba, pomme de lait, estrella, milk fruit and aguay. It is also known by the synonym Achras cainito. In Vietnam, it is called  (: milky breast). In Malayalam it is called  meaning [the tree with] golden leaves. In Cambodia, this fruit is called  which means milk fruit due to its milky juices inside. In Hong Kong, it is called  (: milk fruit), and in China, it is called  (: golden star fruit).

Description

Tree

The leaves are evergreen, alternate, simple oval, entire, 5–15 cm long; the underside shines with a golden color when seen from a distance. The tiny flowers are purplish white and have a sweet fragrant smell. The tree is also hermaphroditic (self-fertile). It produces a strong odor.

Fruit

The fruit is globose and typically measures from 2 to 3 inches in diameter.   When ripe, it usually has purple skin with a faint green area appearing around the calyx.  A radiating star pattern is visible in the pulp. Greenish-white and yellow-fruited cultivars are sometimes available. The skin is rich in latex, and both it and the rind are not edible. The flattened seeds are light brown and hard. It is a seasonal fruit bearing tree.

The fruits are used as a fresh dessert fruit; it is sweet and often served chilled. Infusions of the leaves have been used against diabetes and articular rheumatism.
The fruit has antioxidant properties.
The bark is considered a tonic and stimulant, and a bark decoction is used as an antitussive. The fruit also exists in three colors, dark purple, greenish brown and yellow. The purple fruit has a denser skin and texture while the greenish brown fruit has a thin skin and a more liquid pulp; the yellow variety is less common and difficult to find.

A number of closely related species, also called star apples, are grown in Africa including C. albidum and C. africanum.

In Vietnam, the most famous variety is Lò Rèn milk fruit coming from Vĩnh Kim commune, Châu Thành District, Tiền Giang Province.

Gallery

References

External links

 Dept. of Horticulture Purdue University
 Quisqualis Site Entry for C. cainito
 Vietnamese name of Chrysophyllum cainito is vú sữa

cainito
Trees of the Caribbean
Trees of Central America
Plants described in 1753
Taxa named by Carl Linnaeus
Edible fruits
Flora without expected TNC conservation status